Grace Caroline Currey (née Fulton) is an American actress and dancer.

Life and career 
Currey is the daughter of Damian Fulton, an artist, and his wife Alisa.

Starting as a child actress, her first role was playing the 4-year-old version of Heather Paige Kent's character in a 2001 episode of That's Life. Graduating to adult roles, she portrayed Mary Bromfield in the DC Extended Universe 2019 film Shazam!, which was directed by David F. Sandberg. In 2022, she starred in the thriller Fall, with Virginia Gardner, and reprised the role of Mary Bromfield in the 2023 sequel Shazam! Fury of the Gods.

Filmography

Film

Television

Awards and nominations

References

External links
 
 
 

21st-century American actresses
American child actresses
American film actresses
American television actresses
Living people
Place of birth missing (living people)
Year of birth missing (living people)